Prasophyllum helophilum is a species of orchid endemic to New South Wales. It has a single tubular green leaf and up to twenty five purplish white and brown flowers. It grows in wet, swampy places on the central tablelands.

Description
As with others in the genus, the flowers are inverted so that the labellum is above the column rather than below it. The edges of the labellum are wavy and there is a yellowish-green and dark green callus in its centre. Flowering occurs in January and February.

Taxonomy and naming
Prasophyllum helophilum was first formally described in 2006 by David Jones and Dean Rouse. The description was published in Australian Orchid Research from a specimen collected  near the Kowmung River in the Kanangra-Boyd National Park. The specific epithet (helophilum) is "derived from the Greek helos, marsh, meadow and -philum, loving, in reference to its marshy or swampy habitat".

Distribution and habitat
This leek orchid is found on the Boyd Plateau in the Kanangra-Boyd National Park and on Mount Werong in the southern part of the Blue Mountains National Park.

References

External links 
 

helophilum
Flora of New South Wales
Endemic orchids of Australia
Plants described in 2006